Othella Harrington (born January 31, 1974) is an American former professional basketball player.  After he finished his high school career at Murrah High School, he played in college at Georgetown University where he teamed with future NBA star Allen Iverson. Harrington was drafted 30th overall (1st pick of the second round) in the 1996 NBA Draft by the Houston Rockets.

High school career
Playing at basketball powerhouse Murrah, Harrington was ranked number one or two (depending on the publication), along with Jason Kidd, as the best player in the nation. In his senior year, he averaged 28.9 points, 24.9 rebounds, and 5.8 blocked shots a game. He recorded 2,303 total rebounds in his career at Murrah, which is the second best all-time mark in high school basketball history according to the National Federation of State High School Associations (the record is 3,059, held by Bruce Williams of Florien, Louisiana). In his junior season he posted 756 total rebounds, and in his senior season he had 971, which is the second best result all-time for high school basketball behind Bruce Williams' 1,139 in 1979–80. After winning Mr. Basketball in the state of Mississippi for the second consecutive year and being named first team All-American by both Parade and USA Today, Harrington was selected MVP of the 1992 McDonald's All American game as he set a game record with 21 rebounds to go along with 19 points.

College career
Harrington accepted a scholarship to Georgetown University following fellow "big men" Patrick Ewing, Dikembe Mutombo, and Alonzo Mourning to play for coach John Thompson. He was named Big East Freshman of the Year and was a 2nd Team All-American selection heading into his sophomore year. Harrington would leave Georgetown ranked fifth in all-time scoring, with a career field goal percentage of 56%, fifth in blocks, fourth in rebounding overall and finished as the school's all-time leader in offensive rebounds.

Professional career
After three seasons in Houston, Harrington was traded on August 27, 1999, by the Rockets along with Antoine Carr, Brent Price, Michael Dickerson and a future first-round draft choice to the Vancouver Grizzlies as part of a three-way deal in which the Rockets received the draft rights to Steve Francis, Tony Massenburg from the Grizzlies, and Don MacLean and future first-round draft choice from the Orlando Magic, and the Magic received Michael Smith, Rodrick Rhodes, Lee Mayberry and Makhtar N'Diaye from the Grizzlies. During his first year in Vancouver, Othella averaged career highs in points (13.1), rebounds (6.9), assists (1.2), blocks (.71), and minutes (32.6) per game while starting all 82 games of the 1999–2000 regular season.

He was later traded again on January 30, 2001, to the New York Knicks for Erick Strickland and two draft picks. In 2004, he was involved in a trade that sent him, Dikembe Mutombo, Frank Williams, and Cezary Trybanski to the Chicago Bulls in exchange for Jamal Crawford and Jerome Williams.

Harrington signed with the Charlotte Bobcats on July 19, 2006.

In March 2009, Harrington signed with the Los Angeles D-Fenders, the NBA Development League affiliate of the Los Angeles Lakers.

He spent the next season in Iran, with Petrochimi Bandar Imam BC.

Coaching career
In 2011, Harrington was hired as an assistant coach at his alma mater Georgetown.

NBA career statistics

Regular season

|-
| align="left" | 1996–97
| align="left" | Houston
| 57 || 1 || 15.1 || .549 || .000 || .605 || 3.5 || .3 || .2 || .4 || 4.8
|-
| align="left" | 1997–98
| align="left" | Houston
| 58 || 3 || 15.6 || .485 || .000 || .754 || 3.6 || .4 || .2 || .5 || 6.0
|-
| align="left" | 1998–99
| align="left" | Houston
| 41 || 10 || 22.0 || .513 || .000 || .721 || 6.0 || .4 || .1 || .6 || 9.8
|-
| align="left" | 1999–00
| align="left" | Vancouver
| 82 || 82 || 32.6 || .506 || .000 || .792 || 6.9 || 1.2 || .4 || .7 || 13.1
|-
| align="left" | 2000–01
| align="left" | Vancouver
| 44 || 40 || 28.8 || .466 || .000 || .779 || 6.6 || .8 || .4 || .6 || 10.9
|-
| align="left" | 2000–01
| align="left" | New York
| 30 || 5 || 18.3 || .554 || .000 || .729 || 3.3 || .7 || .5 || .6 || 6.2
|-
| align="left" | 2001–02
| align="left" | New York
| 77 || 4 || 20.3 || .527 || .000 || .709 || 4.5 || .5 || .4 || .5 || 7.7
|-
| align="left" | 2002–03
| align="left" | New York
| 74 || 64 || 25.0 || .508 || .000 || .820 || 6.4 || .8 || .2 || .3 || 7.7
|-
| align="left" | 2003–04
| align="left" | New York
| 56 || 3 || 15.6 || .495 || .000 || .744 || 3.2 || .5 || .2 || .3 || 4.6
|-
| align="left" | 2004–05
| align="left" | Chicago
| 70 || 28 || 18.2 || .512 || .000 || .718 || 4.2 || .8 || .3 || .3 || 8.0
|-
| align="left" | 2005–06
| align="left" | Chicago
| 72 || 23 || 11.4 || .495 || .000 || .626 || 2.1 || .5 || .1 || .2 || 4.8
|-
| align="left" | 2006–07
| align="left" | Charlotte
| 26 || 0 || 8.5 || .446 || .000 || .773 || 1.5 || .2 || .0 || .0 || 2.6
|-
| align="left" | 2007–08
| align="left" | Charlotte
| 22 || 0 || 7.5 || .429 || .000 || .625 || 1.9 || .2 || .1 || .2 || 2.1
|- class="sortbottom"
| style="text-align:center;" colspan="2"| Career
| 709 || 263 || 19.6 || .505 || .000 || .738 || 4.4 || .6 || .3 || .4 || 7.4

Playoffs

|-
| align="left" | 1997
| align="left" | Houston
| 7 || 0 || 2.1 || .500 || .000 || .700 || .6 || .0 || .0 || .0 || 1.3
|-
| align="left" | 1998
| align="left" | Houston
| 3 || 0 || 7.7 || .500 || .000 || .800 || 2.3 || .0 || .0 || .3 || 5.3
|-
| align="left" | 1999
| align="left" | Houston
| 4 || 0 || 10.5 || .643 || .000 || .667 || 3.5 || .3 || .0 || .3 || 5.5
|-
| align="left" | 2001
| align="left" | New York
| 5 || 1 || 15.4 || .500 || .000 || .800 || 3.0 || .4 || .8 || .4 || 3.6
|-
| align="left" | 2005
| align="left" | Chicago
| 6 || 6 || 17.2 || .500 || .000 || .545 || 2.5 || .5 || .2 || .0 || 8.0
|-
| align="left" | 2006
| align="left" | Chicago
| 3 || 0 || 5.0 || .000 || .000 || .000 || .7 || .0 || .3 || .0 || .0
|- class="sortbottom"
| style="text-align:center;" colspan="2"| Career
| 28 || 7 || 9.8 || .506 || .000 || .676 || 2.0 || .2 || .2 || .1 || 4.0

References

External links
 
Othella Harrington D-League profile

1974 births
Living people
African-American basketball players
American expatriate basketball people in Canada
American expatriate basketball people in Iran
American men's basketball players
Basketball coaches from Mississippi
Basketball players from Jackson, Mississippi
Centers (basketball)
Charlotte Bobcats players
Chicago Bulls players
Georgetown Hoyas men's basketball players
Houston Rockets draft picks
Houston Rockets players
Los Angeles D-Fenders players
McDonald's High School All-Americans
New York Knicks players
Parade High School All-Americans (boys' basketball)
Petrochimi Bandar Imam BC players
Power forwards (basketball)
Sportspeople from Jackson, Mississippi
Universiade gold medalists for the United States
Universiade medalists in basketball
Vancouver Grizzlies players
Medalists at the 1995 Summer Universiade
21st-century African-American sportspeople
20th-century African-American sportspeople